QPQ may refer to:

 Quid pro quo, Latin phrase meaning something for something
 Quench polish quench (QPQ), a process for hardening steel